Shams al-Muluk Muhammad of Tabaristan was the ruler of the Bavand dynasty from 1249 to 1271. He was the son and successor of Ardashir II of Tabaristan.

Biography 
Muhammad had close relations with his ally the Paduspanid Shahragim, and even married his daughter. During the reign of the Ilkhanid Abaqa Khan, Muhammad and Shahrigam were ordered to aid the Ilkhanids in the prolonged siege of the Gerdkuh fortress, which was held by the Ismailites. Muhammad and Shahragim deserted after some time, however. Abaqa Khan responded by invading Mazandaran. The two kings were then forgiven. Muhammad then joined the armies of the Ilkhanid, but was shortly arrested because of his recklessness. After hearing about Muhammad's imprisonment, Shahragim revolted against Abaqa, which resulted in the execution of Muhammad, who was succeeded by his brother Ali II of Tabaristan.

Sources 
 
 

13th-century Bavandid rulers
1271 deaths
Year of birth unknown